Hospodi is a studio album by the Polish black metal artist Bartłomiej "Bart" Krysiuk, released on July 12, 2019 through Metal Blade Records under the name "Batushka" after a legal falling out and subsequent legal dispute between  Krysiuk and Krzysztof "Derph" Drabikowski, the original founder of Batushka. Drabikowski wrote and released the follow-up to 2015's Litourgiya, called Panihida, the same year under the name "Batushka", causing confusion under fans with regards to who the 'real' Batushka was after Krysiuk attempted to gain control of the "Batushka" name from Drabikowski by hijacking the band's social media.

Track listing

Charts

Certifications

Personnel
 Варфоломей – lead vocals, producer
 Paweł Jaroszewicz – drums

See also 
 List of number-one albums of 2019 (Poland)

References

2019 albums
Metal Blade Records albums